During the 1992–93 English football season, Everton F.C. competed in the inaugural season of the FA Premier League.

Season summary
1992–93 was the first year of the new FA Premier League, which took over from the Football League First Division as the highest division of English football. However Everton finished 13th, their lowest league finish for over a decade, and pressure grew upon Howard Kendall.

Final league table

Results
Everton's score comes first

Legend

FA Premier League

FA Cup

League Cup

First-team squad

Transfers

In
  Preki -  St. Louis Storm, £100,000, 1992

References

Everton F.C. seasons
Everton F.C.
Everton F.C. season